Association Sportive Pirae  is a football club from Pirae in Tahiti. They are one of the most successful teams in Tahiti having won the Tahiti Division Fédérale nine times. They are also the first French Polynesian team to have reached the final of the OFC Champions League, which they achieved in 2006. In 2022 they were selected by the OFC to participate in the 2021 FIFA Club World Cup, as the representatives of the OFC.

Oceania Club Championship 2006
AS Pirae qualified for the Oceania Club Championship 2006 after winning the Division Fédérale. In the group stages they recorded big wins against Marist FC 10–1, and Sobou FC 7–0, which was enough to secure their passage to the semi-finals despite a 1–0 defeat to Auckland City in the last game. In the semi-finals they pulled off a major shock beating YoungHeart Manawatu 2–1 thanks to early goals from Jose Hmae and Naea Bennett. However, in the Final they met Auckland City once again and suffered a 3–1 defeat. This remains the best performance by any French Polynesian side in the premier Oceanian club competition.

Facts
Between 2007 and 2010 Pirae have been unable to replicate the form that saw them finish runners-up in the Oceania Club Championship and they have not qualified for the competition in its new form the OFC Champions League. In the 2009–10 season Pirae finished 4th in the Division Fédérale and then 4th in the Championship play-off.

2021 FIFA Club World Cup
Pirae participated in the 2021 FIFA Club World Cup as Oceanian representatives, after being nominated by the Oceania Football Confederation (OFC) on 31 December 2021. Initially, Auckland City were nominated by the OFC after the 2021 OFC Champions League was cancelled due to the COVID-19 pandemic. However, Auckland City withdrew from the competition on 31 December 2021 due to delayed reopening of the borders in New Zealand related to the COVID-19 pandemic, and the reintroduction of the mandatory managed isolation and quarantine system upon returning to the country. As a result, Pirae were nominated instead by the OFC, based on sporting merit principles. Pirae lost 4–1 in the play-off match of Club World cup against hosts Al Jazira, with their only goal coming via an own goal from Mohammed Rabii.

Honours

National
Tahiti Ligue 1
Champions (11): 1989, 1991, 1993, 1994, 2001, 2003, 2006, 2013–14, 2019–20, 2020–21 2021-22.

Tahiti Cup
Winners (9): 1970, 1980, 1984, 1994, 1996, 1999, 2000, 2002, 2005

Tahiti Coupe des Champions
Winners (3): 1996, 2021, 2022.

International
Oceania Club Championship
Runners-up: 2006

Pacific French Territories Cup
Winners: 2001, 2007

Coupe D.O.M-T.O.M
Winners: 2002

Recent seasons

The club in the French football structure
French Cup: 10 appearances
 1989–90, 1990–91, 1992–93, 1993–94, 1994–95, 1996–97, 1998–99, 1999–00, 2000–01, 2002–03

Performance in OFC competitions
OFC Champions League: 1 appearance
Best: Semi-finalist, 2013–14

Oceania Club Championship: 1 appearance
Best:
2006: Finalist

Current squad
Nominated squad for the 2021 FIFA Club World Cup taking place in UAE.

Current staff for the tournament

References

 
Football clubs in Tahiti
Football clubs in French Polynesia